Martine Beswick (born 26 September 1941) is Jamaican-born British actress and model perhaps best known for her roles in two James Bond films, From Russia with Love (1963) and Thunderball (1965), who went on to appear in several other notable films in the 1960s. In 2019, she was inducted into the Rondo Hatton Classic Horror Awards' Monster Kid Hall of Fame.

Early years
Beswick was born on 26 September 1941 in Port Antonio, Jamaica, to Ronald Stuart Davis Beswick, a British father and Myrtle May (née Penso, 1912-2017) a Portuguese-Jamaican mother. Beswick, her sister Laurellie (1943–2002) and her mother moved to London in 1954 following the separation of her parents. In 1955, she left high school to work to help support her family.

Film career
Beswick is best known for her two appearances in the James Bond film series. Although she auditioned for the first Bond film Dr. No (1962), she was cast in the second film From Russia with Love (1963) as the fiery gypsy girl, Zora. She engaged in a "catfight" scene with her rival Vida (played by former Miss Israel Aliza Gur). Beswick later stated that there was as much bad feeling with Gur offscreen as well as on, with the film's director, Terence Young, encouraging Beswick to get rough with Gur.

"I was a very nice girl but Aliza was a cow. We had terrible clashes and I was disgusted with her.  I had a lot of anger inside of me so that [fight] scene was a perfect way to work it out. We rehearsed the fight for three weeks but when we shot it, Aliza was really fighting. Everyone encouraged me to fight back, so I did. We got into a real scrapping match." — Martine Beswick 

She was incorrectly billed as "Martin Beswick" in the title sequence. Beswick then appeared as the ill-fated Paula Caplan in Thunderball (1965). She had been away from the Caribbean so long that she was required to sunbathe constantly for two weeks before filming, to look like a local.

Beswick went on to appear in One Million Years B.C. (1966) opposite Raquel Welch, with whom she also engaged in a catfight. She played Adelita in the well-regarded Spaghetti Western, A Bullet for the General (1966) opposite Klaus Kinski and Gian Maria Volonté and played a villainous role in the exploitation thriller The Penthouse (1967).  She then appeared in various Hammer Studio low-budget films, most notably Prehistoric Women (1967) (aka Slave Girls of the White Rhinoceros) and the gender-bending horror Dr. Jekyll and Sister Hyde (1971), in which she played the titular villainess. She had a supporting role in the Italian sex comedy The Last Italian Tango (1973).  She then starred as the Queen of Evil in Oliver Stone's 1974 directorial debut Seizure, or Queen of Evil. In the 1970s, Beswick moved to Hollywood and regularly appeared on both the big and small screens. She made numerous guest appearances on television series, including Sledge Hammer!, Fantasy Island, The Fall Guy, Mannix, The Six Million Dollar Man and Falcon Crest. In 1980, she played the lead role in the comedy film The Happy Hooker Goes Hollywood.

Beswick's career was active well into the 1990s. Since then, she has mainly participated in film documentaries, providing commentary and relating her experiences on the many films in which she has appeared. She owned a removals business in London, but is now semiretired except for her guest appearances at international Bond conventions. In April 2013, she was one of 12 Bond Girl celebrity guests in an episode of the BBC's Masterchef. Beginning with Melvin and Howard (1980), she changed the spelling of her last name to "Beswicke", but reverted to her original surname in the mid-1990s; her last credit with the longer spelling is Wide Sargasso Sea (1993). After a 24 year absence from the screen, Beswick came out of retirement in 2018 to appear in House of the Gorgon opposite fellow Hammer film actors Caroline Munro, Veronica Carlson, and Christopher Neame.

Filmography

Film

Television

References

External links
 
 
 
 Martine Beswick at HorrorStars
 Martine Beswick interviewed by M J Simpson

1941 births
Living people
English female models
English film actresses
English television actresses
Jamaican people of English descent
Jamaican people of Portuguese descent
People from Port Antonio
Spaghetti Western actresses
20th-century English actresses